James P. "Jim" Hayes (born July 23, 1964) is an American politician from Amherst, New York who served in the New York State Assembly from 1999 to 2011. Elected in 1998, he represented parts of Erie and Niagara counties until his resignation in September 2011.

Previous to his election, from 1995–1998, he served as the first director of development for Catholic Charities of Buffalo. Prior to that he served as director of alumni relations and as an admissions counselor to Canisius College, where he earned his B.A. degree in political science in 1986.

Hayes was born in Erie County and resides in Amherst, New York. He and his wife Renee have three children.

Hayes announced his resignation effective September 6, 2011, to work in the private sector.

References

External links
James P. Hayes at The League of Women Voters

1964 births
Living people
Republican Party members of the New York State Assembly
Canisius College alumni
21st-century American politicians